Mardonius may refer to:

 Mardonius (nephew of Darius I), Persian commander during the second Persian invasion of Greece
 Mardonius (philosopher), tutor and adviser of Roman emperor Julian (331–363)
 Mardonius (genus), a genus of giant African millipedes

See also 
 Operation Mardonius, a 1943 British military campaign